Dallas Christian College (DCC) is a private Christian college in Farmers Branch, Texas.  It is affiliated with the Christian Church and accredited by the Association for Biblical Higher Education.

Extracurricular activities
DCC has men's and women's basketball and soccer teams, women's volleyball as well as the addition of a men's baseball team as of fall 2009. They compete in the NCCAA and the ACCA.

The choir sings on a bi-annual tour in community churches across the country. In 2006 they joined the SMU Meadows Choir to sing at the Morton H. Meyerson Symphony Center in Dallas.

Athletics
The Dallas Christian athletic teams are called the Crusaders. The college is a member of the National Christian Collegiate Athletic Association (NCCAA), primarily competing as an independent in the Southwest Region of the Division II level.

Dallas Christian competes in 11 intercollegiate varsity sports: Men's sports include baseball, basketball, cross country, golf and soccer; while women's sports include basketball, cross country, golf, soccer, softball and volleyball.

References

External links

 
 Official athletics website

Association for Biblical Higher Education
Universities and colleges in the Dallas–Fort Worth metroplex
Universities and colleges in Dallas County, Texas
Universities and colleges affiliated with the Christian churches and churches of Christ
Association of Christian College Athletics member schools
Educational institutions established in 1950
1950 establishments in Texas